Ada E. Yonath (born 22 June 1939) is a Nobel laureate crystallographer best known for her pioneering work on the structure of ribosomes. She is the current director of the Helen and Milton A. Kimmelman Center for Biomolecular Structure and Assembly of the Weizmann Institute of Science.

In 2009, Yonath received the Nobel Prize in Chemistry along with Venkatraman Ramakrishnan and Thomas A. Steitz for her studies on the structure and function of the ribosome, becoming the first Israeli woman to win the Nobel Prize out of ten Israeli Nobel laureates, the first woman from the Middle East to win a Nobel prize in the sciences, and the first woman in 45 years to win the Nobel Prize for Chemistry.

Biography
Ada Lifshitz (later Yonath) was born in the Geula quarter of Jerusalem. Her parents, Hillel and Esther Lifshitz, were Zionist Jews who immigrated to the British Mandate of Palestine (now Israel) from Zduńska Wola, Poland in 1933 before the establishment of Israel. Her father was a rabbi and came from a rabbinical family. They settled in Jerusalem and ran a grocery, but found it difficult to make ends meet. They lived in cramped quarters with several other families, and Yonath remembers "books" being the only thing she had to keep her occupied. Despite their poverty, her parents sent her to school in the upscale Beit HaKerem neighborhood to assure her a good education. When her father died at the age of 42, the family moved to Tel Aviv.

Yonath was accepted to Tichon Hadash high school although her mother could not pay the tuition. She gave math lessons to students in return. As a youngster, she says she was inspired by the Polish and naturalized-French scientist Marie Curie. However, she stresses that Curie, whom she as a child was fascinated by after reading her biography, was not her "role model". She returned to Jerusalem for college, graduating from the Hebrew University of Jerusalem with a bachelor's degree in chemistry in 1962, and a master's degree in biochemistry in 1964. In 1968, she obtained her PhD from the Weizmann Institute of Science for X-ray crystallographic studies on the structure of collagen, with Wolfie Traub as her PhD advisor.

She has one daughter, Hagit Yonath, a doctor at Sheba Medical Center, and a granddaughter, Noa. She is the cousin of anti-occupation activist Ruchama Marton.

She has called for the unconditional release of all Hamas prisoners, saying that "holding Palestinians captive encourages and perpetuates their motivation to harm Israel and its citizens ... once we don't have any prisoners to release they will have no reason to kidnap soldiers".

Scientific career

Yonath accepted postdoctoral positions at Carnegie Mellon University (1969) and MIT (1970). While a postdoc at MIT she spent some time in the lab of subsequent 1976 chemistry Nobel Prize winner William N. Lipscomb, Jr. of Harvard University where she was inspired to pursue very large structures.

In 1970, she established what was for nearly a decade the only protein crystallography laboratory in Israel. Then, from 1979 to 1984 she was a group leader with Heinz-Günter Wittmann at the Max Planck Institute for Molecular Genetics in Berlin. She was visiting professor at the University of Chicago in 1977–78. She headed a Max-Planck Institute Research Unit at DESY in Hamburg, Germany (1986–2004) in parallel to her research activities at the Weizmann Institute.

Yonath focuses on the mechanisms underlying protein biosynthesis, by ribosomal crystallography, a research line she pioneered over twenty years ago despite considerable skepticism of the international scientific community. Ribosomes translate RNA into protein and because they have slightly different structures in microbes, when compared to eukaryotes, such as human cells, they are often a target for antibiotics. In 2000 and 2001, she determined the complete high-resolution structures of both ribosomal subunits and discovered within the otherwise asymmetric ribosome, the universal symmetrical region that provides the framework and navigates the process of polypeptide polymerization. Consequently, she showed that the ribosome is a ribozyme that places its substrates in stereochemistry suitable for peptide bond formation and for substrate-mediated catalysis. In 1993 she visualized the path taken by the nascent proteins, namely the ribosomal tunnel, and recently revealed the dynamics elements enabling its involvement in elongation arrest, gating, intra-cellular regulation and nascent chain trafficking into their folding space.

Additionally, Yonath elucidated the modes of action of over twenty different antibiotics targeting the ribosome, illuminated mechanisms of drug resistance and synergism, deciphered the structural basis for antibiotic selectivity and showed how it plays a key role in clinical usefulness and therapeutic effectiveness, thus paving the way for structure-based drug design.

For enabling ribosomal crystallography Yonath introduced a novel technique, cryo bio-crystallography, which became routine in structural biology and allowed intricate projects otherwise considered formidable.

At the Weizmann Institute, Yonath is the incumbent of the Martin S. and Helen Kimmel Professorial Chair.

Awards and recognition

Yonath is a member of the United States National Academy of Sciences; the American Academy of Arts and Sciences; the Israel Academy of Sciences and Humanities; the European Academy of Sciences and Art and the European Molecular Biology Organization. On Saturday, 18 October 2014, Professor Yonath was named an ordinary member of the Pontifical Academy of Sciences by Pope Francis.

Her awards and honors include the following:
 In 2002, Israel Prize
 In 2002, Harvey Prize
 In 2004, Massry Prize
 In 2004, Paul Karrer Gold Medal
 In 2005, Louisa Gross Horwitz Prize
 In 2006, Wolf Prize in Chemistry along with George Feher.
 In 2006, Rothschild Prize in Life Sciences.
 In 2006, The EMET Prize for Art, Science and Culture in Life Sciences, along with Professor Peretz Lavie (Medicine) and Professor Eli Keshet (Biology)
 In 2007, Paul Ehrlich and Ludwig Darmstaedter Prize along with Harry Noller
 In 2008, the Albert Einstein World Award of Science for her pioneering contributions to protein biosynthesis in the field of ribosomal crystallography and her introduction of innovative techniques in cryo bio-crystallography.
 In 2009, the Nobel Prize in Chemistry (co-recipient with Thomas Steitz and Venkatraman Ramakrishnan). She was the first Israeli woman to be awarded a Nobel Prize.
 In 2010, Wilhelm Exner Medal
 In 2011, Marie Curie Medal awarded by the Polish Chemical Society
 In 2013 she became a member of the German Academy of Sciences Leopoldina.
 In 2015, she was awarded Honorary Doctorates from the De La Salle University, Manila/Philippines; the Joseph Fourier University, Grenoble/France; the Medical University of Lodz, Lodz/Poland; and the University of Warwick, UK.
 In 2018, she was awarded an Honorary Doctorate from Carnegie Mellon University
 In 2020, she was elected a Foreign Member of the Royal Society.

See also
 Women of Israel
 History of RNA biology
 List of Israel Prize recipients
 List of female Nobel laureates
 List of Israeli Nobel laureates
 List of Jewish Nobel laureates
 List of peace activists
 List of RNA biologists
 Timeline of women in science
 Women in chemistry

References

External links

 "APS user shares the “Israeli Nobel” for chemistry", from the Argonne National Laboratory Advanced Photon Source (APS), United States Department of Energy
 The Official Site of Louisa Gross Horwitz Prize
 Weizmann Institute of Science, Yonath-Site
 Ada Yonath's Publication list
 Talk of Ada Yonath at the Origins 2011 congress
 

1939 births
Living people
Nobel laureates in Chemistry
Women Nobel laureates
Israeli Nobel laureates
Albert Einstein World Award of Science Laureates
Crystallographers
Israeli biochemists
Israel Prize in chemistry recipients
Israel Prize women recipients
Israeli Jews
Israeli people of Polish-Jewish descent
Israeli pacifists
Israeli women chemists
Israeli women scientists
Jewish chemists
Jewish pacifists
Jews in Mandatory Palestine
Jewish women scientists
L'Oréal-UNESCO Awards for Women in Science laureates
Members of the European Academy of Sciences and Arts
Members of the European Molecular Biology Organization
Members of the Israel Academy of Sciences and Humanities
Foreign associates of the National Academy of Sciences
People from Jerusalem
People from Tel Aviv
University of Chicago faculty
Academic staff of Weizmann Institute of Science
Weizmann Institute of Science alumni
Wolf Prize in Chemistry laureates
Women biologists
Carnegie Mellon University fellows
Massry Prize recipients
Articles containing video clips
20th-century women scientists
21st-century women scientists
Foreign Members of the Royal Society
Members of the German Academy of Sciences Leopoldina